Concord Oval (also Waratah Stadium), is a rugby football stadium in the inner-west Sydney suburb of Concord, Australia. The stadium is able to hold 5,000 people as of November 2022, down from 20,000 when the Concord Oval was opened in 1985. , it is used mostly for rugby union matches and hosted eight matches during the 1987 Rugby World Cup. It is also a venue for soccer matches and local rugby league matches.

It is the home ground of West Harbour RFC in the Shute Shield rugby union competition, and was the home of Greater Sydney Rams in the defunct National Rugby Championship. It is also the training and administration base for the Wests Tigers rugby league club. The Inter Lions SC soccer club also plays some home games at the ground.

Facilities
Since 2022, the stadium has a grandstand on the western side that doubles as the Wests Tigers training and administration facility. The northern end hosts an indoor community sports facility. A small grass hill is on the eastern side with a basketball court and overflow car park behind it while another grass hill is located at the southern end. During the redevelopment, temporary training and administration facilities for the Wests Tigers were located there.

Prior to the redevelopment in 2021, the stadium had two opposing grandstands. The eastern stand hosts the tennis box-style seats, television gantry and the change rooms. The stand runs approximately from try-line to try-line. The western stand contains a gym and some boxes. This stand runs approximately from dead-ball line to dead ball line. In front of the western stand are two rows of seats, while a concrete path runs around the field (except not in front of the aforementioned two rows of seats, the path runs behind those seats). At each end there is a grassy hill, and at the southern or Parramatta Road end, there is a wooden, manually operated scoreboard with an analogue clock.

The stadium is bordered by Gipps Street to the north, Parramatta Road to the south, Loftus Street to the west and the Cintra Hockey Centre to the east. Parking is at a premium with small carparks behind the northern hill, eastern stand and in the south-east corner, although Burwood train station is not too far away, and the 439, L39, 464 and 466 bus routes pass close to the stadium.

History
St Luke's Park, which was the home ground of Sydney's Western Suburbs Magpies rugby league club in 1910 and 1911 was where Concord Oval is now located. Wests started playing their matches at Pratten Park in 1912, but after pressure from local residents there the council refused the club permission to use that ground, forcing them to return to St. Luke's Oval from 1915 to 1919. From 1920 Wests resumed playing at Pratten Park and played at St Luke's again in 1942.

Concord Oval was reconstructed between 1984 and 1987 to become the home of Rugby union in Sydney and subsequently the redeveloped venue hosted games in the 1987 Rugby World Cup.

The stadium also hosted four first grade rugby league matches, three of them in 1994 as Canterbury's second home ground during that season.

In the early 2010s the City of Canada Bay Council prepared a masterplan  to bring major events back to an expanded and rejuvenated Concord Oval. This includes construction and installation of broadcasting equipment such as satellite dishes, antennas, camera platforms and commentary boxes, as well as training quality floodlighting and a new scoreboard.

In 2020, it was announced that the Concord Oval will undergo a $51 million redevelopment to accommodate the Wests Tigers new training and administration complex to be completed by mid–2021. Demolition works began in mid-2020 with the Eastern Stand completely demolished by July 2020. The new training and administration facility, commercially known as the Zurich Centre was officially opened on November 18, 2022.

Rugby World Cup
Concord Oval hosted six matches of the 1987 Rugby World Cup.

References

External links

Concord Oval Rleague.com.

Western Suburbs Magpies
Rugby World Cup stadiums
Multi-purpose stadiums in Australia
Sports venues completed in 1985
Rugby league stadiums in Australia
Rugby union stadiums in Australia
1985 establishments in Australia
Sports venues in Sydney
Concord, New South Wales
Wests Tigers